Parasites & Vectors is a peer-reviewed open-access medical journal published by BioMed Central. The journal publishes articles on the biology of parasites, parasitic diseases, intermediate hosts, vectors and vector-borne pathogens. Parasites & Vector was established in 2008 as a merger of Filaria Journal and Kinetoplastid Biology, and its launch editor-in-chief was Chris Arme. Since 2013 it has published an associated blog for the parasites and vectors community called BugBitten, and it awards the 'Odile Bain Memorial Prize' (OBMP) to perpetuate the memory of the parasitologist Odile Bain who died in 2012.

References

External links 

BioMed Central academic journals
Biology journals
Publications established in 2008
English-language journals
Open access journals
Parasitology journals
Creative Commons Attribution-licensed journals